Robert Davis (born April 2, 1950) is a retired professional basketball small forward who played one season in the National Basketball Association (NBA) as a member of the Portland Trail Blazers during the 1972–73 season. He attended Weber State University and was selected by the Blazers during the second round (14 pick overall) of the 1972 NBA draft.

External links

1950 births
Living people
American men's basketball players
Basketball players from New York City
Junior college men's basketball players in the United States
Portland Trail Blazers draft picks
Portland Trail Blazers players
Small forwards
Sportspeople from the Bronx
Weber State Wildcats men's basketball players